Menace to Sobriety is the second studio album by American rock band Ugly Kid Joe. It was released in 1995 through Mercury Records. The album title is an allusion to the movie Menace II Society. It peaked at No. 25 on the UK Albums Chart. "Milkman's Son" and "Tomorrow's World" were released as singles. Music videos were released for "Tomorrow's World", "Milkman's Son", and "Cloudy Skies".

Critical reception
Trouser Press noted that singer Whitfield Crane adopted "a new and nasty W. Axl Rose vocal affliction on some songs", and wrote that the band "reintroduce themselves as a growly, serious rock lot attempting to fill the gap left by the Gunners' silence". The Washington Post called the album "more varied and tuneful than its predecessor".

Track listing
 "Intro"  – 1:49
 "God" (Whitfield Crane, Klaus Eichstadt, Dave Fortman) – 2:54
 "Tomorrow's World" (Crane, Eichstadt, Fortman, Shannon Larkin) – 4:18
 "Clover" (Crane, Eichstadt, Fortman) – 3:34
 "C.U.S.T." (Crane, Fortman) – 2:59
 "Milkman's Son" (Crane, Fortman) – 3:51
 "Suckerpath"  – 4:53
 "Cloudy Skies" (Crane, Fortman) – 4:28
 "Jesus Rode a Harley" (Crane, Fortman) – 3:15
 "10/10"  – 3:37
 "V.I.P."  – 3:46
 "Oompa"  – 2:04 (this song is track 7 on side one on the cassette tape)
 "Candle Song"  – 2:56
 "Slower Than Nowhere"  - 5:25 (non-U.S. releases only)

Personnel
Whitfield Crane – lead vocals
Klaus Eichstadt – guitar, backing vocals
Dave Fortman – guitar, backing vocals
Cordell Crockett – bass guitar, backing vocals
Shannon Larkin – drums, percussion

Charts

References

Ugly Kid Joe albums
1995 albums